Singles Only is the second EP by Canadian country music band James Barker Band, released on May 24, 2019. Upon its release, Singles Only debuted at number 68 on the Canadian Albums Chart. The EP includes the Platinum-certified #1 hit "Keep It Simple", and the Gold-certified top ten hits "Good Together" and "There's a Drink for That".

Singles 
"Good Together" was released as the debut single from the then-upcoming EP in January 2018, and peaked at #6 on the Canadian country radio chart. It went on to become the most-played Canadian song at Canadian country radio in 2018, and was certified  Gold by Music Canada. 

"Keep It Simple" was released as the second single in January 2019, and went on to hit #1 on the Canadian country radio chart. It was released to American country radio in May 2019. It peaked at 87 on the Canadian Hot 100 and was certified  Platinum by Music Canada. 

"There's a Drink for That" was released as the third single to radio to coincide with the EP's release in May 2019, and would peak at #2 on the Canadian country radio chart. It was certified  Gold by Music Canada. 

"Slow Down Town" was released as the fourth single in February 2020, and would peak at #21 on the Canada Country chart.

Track listing

Charts

EP

Singles

Awards and nominations

Release history

References 

2019 EPs
James Barker Band albums
Universal Music Canada albums
Albums produced by Todd Clark